This is a list of public holidays in North Korea. See also the Korean calendar for a list of traditional holidays. , the North Korean calendar has 71 official public holidays, including Sundays. In the past, North Koreans relied on rations provided by the state on public holidays for feasts. Recently, with marketization people are able to save up money and buy the goods they need.

The Day of the Sun, the birthday of its founder and first leader Kim Il-sung, on 15 April is the most important holiday in the country. The second most important is the Day of the Shining Star on 16 February, the birthday of Kim Jong-il. , Kim Jong-un's birthday is still not a public holiday. Other holidays of great importance are the Party Foundation Day (10 October) and the Day of the Foundation of the Republic (9 September). North Koreans often schedule their wedding days on important national holidays.

North Korea regularly carries out missile and nuclear tests on such important anniversaries.

List of annual holidays

Momentous changes in political holidays in North Korean calendars
During some years, certain dates related with the Kim regime are additionally designated as public holidays for propaganda purposes.

In the 2014 version of the North Korean calendar, "Generalissimo Day" (대원수추대일) briefly became a holiday that honors when Kim Jong-il posthumously received the title "Generalissimo of the Democratic People's Republic of Korea" in 2012.

In the 2015 calendar, a new public
holiday was to be celebrated on June 19th, marking the date in 1964 when Kim Jong Il graduated from Kim Il Sung University and began working as part of the Party’s organizational leadership. Various events related to the commemorative day take place every year on this date in North Korea, but this was the first time it has been recognized as a national holiday. 

In the 2017 calendar, July 3 became a public holiday called "Day of the Strategic Forces" (전략군절).

See also

Culture of North Korea
List of Korean traditional festivals
North Korean calendar
Public holidays in South Korea

References

External links
 

 
Korea, North